"Summer Girl" is the debut single by Canadian pop band Stereos, written by Patrick Kordyback from their self-titled debut album. It was the song they performed on MuchMusic's disBAND reality show, which led them to being signed by Universal Canada.  It was released as a single in 2009. The song is about meeting a girl and wanting to have a one night stand, despite the fact that both parties have a significant other.

Music video
In the music video, the band is first shown standing in front of a red car with the word Stereos displayed on the license plate as well as performing at a beach party. The lead singer is shown walking around a beach alongside two girls, and then attends the party later that night with one of them. Some of the judges on the episode of disBAND that the band was featured on can be seen talking to the lead singer at the party.

Charts

Weekly charts

Year-end charts

Certification

References

2009 songs
2009 debut singles
Stereos songs
Song recordings produced by Gavin Brown (musician)
Universal Music Group singles